Maria De Fátima Domingas Monteiro Jardim is an Angolan diplomat serving as ambassador to Malta. she was appointed in March 2021 and presented her letter of credence to Maltese President George Vella at Sant’Anton Palace in Attard on 27 May 2021.

References 

Living people
Angolan diplomats
Angolan women diplomats
Year of birth missing (living people)